RP2, RP-2, RP.2, RP 2, or variant, may refer to:
 Rensselaer RP-2, crewed glider
 Radioplane RP-2, drone aircraft
 Rocket Propellant 2 (RP-2), see RP-1
 2-inch RP, a cold-war era Royal Navy rocket
 Retinitis pigmentosa-2 (RP2), see Retinitis pigmentosa
 Asteroid RP2
 5199 Dortmund or 1981 RP2, asteroid Dortmund, RP2 from 1981, the 5199th asteroid catalogued
 (5575) 1985 RP2, RP2 from 1985, the 5575th asteroid catalogued
 12234 Shkuratov or 1986 RP2, asteroid Shkuratov, RP2 from 1986, the 12234th asteroid catalogued
 (85176) 1990 RP2, RP2 from 1990, the 85176th asteroid catalogued
 96217 Gronchi or 1993 RP2, asteroid Gronchi, RP2 from 1993, the 96217th asteroid catalogued
 Real projective plane (RP2)
 RP2 (gene), a gene that encodes protein XRP2